Olga Vashkevich (born 27 October 1988) is a Belarusian basketball player for BC Tsmoki-Minsk and the Belarusian national team, where she participated at the 2014 FIBA World Championship.

References

1988 births
Living people
Belarusian women's basketball players
Power forwards (basketball)
Basketball players from Minsk
Small forwards